KFRH (104.3 FM) is a commercial radio station in North Las Vegas, Nevada, broadcasting to the Las Vegas, Nevada area. Its studios are in the unincorporated Clark County community of Enterprise and the transmitter is on Potosi Mountains west of the Las Vegas Valley. It is owned by Silver State Broadcasting LLC, presently a debtor in possession.  The station was put into a receivership by court order in July 2020.  On March 15, 2021, VCY America, which owns Christian stations across the U.S., began operating the station under a local marketing agreement (LMA). On January 31, 2022, a court ordered possession and control of the station back to Silver State Broadcasting.  It has since started simulcasting KBET Winchester.

History

Adult standards (1987-2005)
In 1981, The FCC held a spectrum auction for the 104.3 frequency, with a construction permit being issued in 1986 to Eight Chiefs, and it was assigned the KJUL callsign on January 14, 1987. KJUL signed on in March 1990 with an adult standards format.

KJUL was sold to Nevada Radio in January 1997, and then again to which merged with Centennial Nevada in 1998.

In 2005, KJUL was awarded Station Of The Year at the NAB Marconi Awards.

Country (2005-2008)
On October 3, 2005, KJUL dropped the adult standards format for country music as "The Coyote." On October 10, KJUL officially became KCYE. (The old callsign was immediately adopted by a station in St. George, Utah. KCYE was later acquired by Beasley Broadcast Group.

Top 40 (2009–2021)

In early 2009, Beasley announced that Royce International Broadcasting would acquire the station. The sale was approved on July 20, and was consummated on August 25, 2009. Upon the closure of the acquisition, KCYE flipped to CHR, branded as 104.3 Now. KCYE also switched callsigns to KFRH, and the former KCYE callsign and branding were relaunched in Boulder City at 102.7 FM.

From April 2016 - June 2018, on behalf of W.B. Music and other music companies, ASCAP successfully sued Royce International Broadcasting Corp. and its subsidiaries in the United States District Court for the Central District of California for copyright infringement. The result was a $330,000 judgment, increased to over $1.3 million with attorney fees and sanctions. 

After Defendants were unable to pay, KFRH was transferred into a court-ordered receivership controlled by broker Larry Patrick on July 6, 2020, along with two other CHR stations mentioned in the lawsuit, KREV (FM) in San Francisco, and KRCK-FM in the Coachella Valley.

The Court Order appointing the Receiver authorized Larry Patrick to take control of the 3 named FM radio stations, and to "solicit offers for the sale of Defendants’ Radio Stations’ assets." However, that appointment order did not give Mr. Patrick control of the business entities.

Christian talk (2020-2022) 
On December 30, 2020, it was announced that VCY America will acquire the three stations.

The December 28, 2020 Asset Purchase Agreement entered into by Larry Patrick has been criticized for being a "fire sale price" of $6 million for all three FM stations, and also because the contract was signed by "W. Lawrence Patrick, solely in his capacity as court-appointed receiver for Silver State Broadcasting LLC, Golden State Broadcasting LLC, and Major Market Radio LLC," while the appointment order clearly states that Patrick is receiver over the three FM stations only, not the business entities. 

On March 15, 2021, after Judge Jesus Bernal denied Stolz' bid to end the receivership and have the stations returned to him, VCY America began operating the three stations under an LMA (local marketing agreement) while the sale of the stations was being finalized.

The LMA, which costs VCY America $5,000 / month to operate all 3 FM Stations, has been criticized for being underpriced. A comparable LMA for a San Francisco FM Radio station was $80,000 / month for 1 station. As with the Asset Purchase Agreement, the LMA was entered into by Larry Patrick purportedly as receiver of the business entities, while the Order of Appointment states that Patrick is receiver over the FM Radio assets only.

Talk (2022-present) 
On January 31, 2022, federal Judge August B. Landis apparently quashed the sale of the stations by ordering Receiver Larry Patrick to turn over control of KFRH-FM (and Stolz's other 2 FM stations) back to Stolz's companies.  It has since started simulcasting KBET Winchester.

References

External links

FRH
FRH
Radio stations established in 1987
1987 establishments in Nevada